Jason Doherty  (born 21 November 1989) is a Gaelic footballer who plays for Burrishoole and the Mayo county team.
He started at centre forward in the 2012 All-Ireland Final which Mayo lost by 0-13 to 2-11 against Donegal.

He studied at NUI Galway and played for the university football team.

Honours
 Connacht Senior Football Championship (5): 2011–2015
 Connacht Under-21 Football Championship (2): 2008–2009
 Sigerson Cup (1): 2013

References

1989 births
Living people
Alumni of the University of Galway
Mayo inter-county Gaelic footballers
University of Galway Gaelic footballers
People from Castlebar